Vitaly Zhuk (born 3 July 1973) is a Belarusian wrestler. He competed in the men's Greco-Roman 63 kg at the 2000 Summer Olympics.

References

External links
 

1973 births
Living people
Belarusian male sport wrestlers
Olympic wrestlers of Belarus
Wrestlers at the 2000 Summer Olympics
21st-century Belarusian people